The finswimming events at the 2001 World Games in Akita was played between 24 and 25 August.  A total o 76 athletes from 17 nations participated in the tournament. The competition took place in Akita Prefectural Pool.

Participating nations

Medal table

Events

Men

Women

References

External links
 World Underwater Federation
 Finswimming on IWGA website
 Results

 
2001 World Games
2001